Anna-Maria Fernandez and Julie Richardson were the defending champions but they competed with different partners that year, Fernandez with Louise Field and Richardson with Belinda Cordwell.

Cordwell and Richardson lost in the second round to Emmanuelle Derly and Ann Devries.

Fernandez and Field lost in the semifinals to Cammy MacGregor and Cynthia MacGregor.

Patty Fendick and Jill Hetherington won in the final 6–2, 6–1 against the MacGregors.

Seeds
Champion seeds are indicated in bold text while text in italics indicates the round in which those seeds were eliminated. All eight seeded teams received byes into the second round.

Draw

Final

Top half

Bottom half

References
 1988 Nutri-Metics Open Doubles Draw

1988 Doubles
1988 WTA Tour